Karl Whatham (born 27 August 1981) is an Australian-born cricketer who has played one One Day International for Canada.

Career
Whatham was a member of the Canadian squad for the 2011 Cricket World Cup in India, Sri Lanka and Bangladesh.  He made his debut in Canadian final group match against Australia, where he scored 18 runs from 41 balls.

Living in British Columbia, Whatham was employed by the organising committee for the 2010 Winter Olympics as a procurement coordinator.

References

External links 
CricketArchive profile
Cricinfo profile

1981 births
Living people
Canada One Day International cricketers
Canadian cricketers
Cricketers at the 2011 Cricket World Cup
Australian emigrants to Canada